The Liberal Democratic Party is a political party in Bangladesh. The party was formed after abolishing Bikolpo Dhara on 26 October 2006 by former President of Bangladesh Dr. A. Q. M. Badruddoza Chowdhury, Dr. Oli Ahmad Bir Bikram, and 24 other former members of parliament and ministers from the Bangladesh Nationalist Party (BNP).

Soon after its formation Dr. B. Chowdhury left LDP with his followers back to Bikalpa Dhara again. Thereafter, Dr. Oli Ahmad was elected as President and Former Speaker Sheikh Razzak Ali as Executive President of the party. From its inception LDP was an ally of the Grand Alliance.

However, before the 2008 election, LDP came out of the grand alliance and contested the elections on their own. President of LDP Oli Ahmed won for the sixth time from Chittagong-13. In 2012, LDP joined the 18 Party Alliance led by Bangladesh Nationalist Party.

References

External links
 Official website

2006 establishments in Bangladesh
Liberal parties in Asia
Political parties established in 2006
Political parties in Bangladesh
Social liberal parties